Thomas Smyth Abraham (19 June 1838 – 14 December 1873) was an English first-class cricketer.

Life
Born at Exeter, Devon, he was the son of Richard Thomas Abraham of the city. He matriculated at Exeter College, Oxford in 1856, graduating B.A. in 1861. He was called to the bar at Lincoln's Inn in 1865.

Abraham died at Algiers in French Algeria, on 14 December 1873.

Cricket
Abraham's batting and bowling styles are unknown. He made one appearance in first-class cricket for the Gentlemen of England against Cambridge University in 1870 at Fenner's, Cambridge. He batted twice in the match, scoring 9 runs in the Gentlemen's first-innings, before he was dismissed by Walter Money, while in their second-innings he was dismissed for a duck by the same bowler. He also bowled a total of 22 overs across the match, which ended in a draw, despite the Gentlemen being asked to follow-on.

References

External links 
Thomas Abraham at ESPNcricinfo
Thomas Abraham at CricketArchive

1838 births
1873 deaths
Cricketers from Exeter
English cricketers
Gentlemen of England cricketers